Solanum laciniatum is a soft-wooded shrub native to the east coast of Australia, notably Victoria and Tasmania.  It also occurs in Western Australia and New Zealand, where some authorities consider it to be introduced.  It is similar to Solanum aviculare, with which it shares the common name kangaroo apple. The common name refers to the likeness of the leaf shape to a kangaroo paw print. This plant is currently being cultivated to produce corticosteroid drugs.

Description

Habitat
Grows in well-drained soils in full sun or partial shade. Tolerates moderately salty winds. Is very fast growing but short lived. Solanum laciniatum often colonises disturbed soil and tracks.

Images

References

External links
 
 

laciniatum
Plants described in 1789
Flora of Victoria (Australia)
Flora of Tasmania
Flora of New Zealand
Eudicots of Western Australia